Angeliki "Antzy" Samiou (born March 7, 1960) is a Greek modern laïka singer and also a radio producer.

Biography
Antzy Samiou wanted to be a singer from a very young age and by the late '80s she started to work professionally singing in show centers and clubs. In 1990, she penned lyrics for Dimitris Mitropanos's song "Esi Lege Me Erota" (You may call me Love), which came out as a single from the album of the same name. On her birthday in March 1993, her debut album "To Adynato Simeio Mou" (My weak spot) was released. The title track became a radio hit and she began to achieve recognition in the music industry.

In May 1995, her second studio album "I Pio Glikia mou Amartia" (My sweetest sin) was released and she began nightly appearances at an Athens club to promote it. Her third studio album "Tou Erota I Mihani" (The love machine) was released in October 1996, and the single "Mi Fevgeis Apopse" (Don't leave tonight) was voted the best ballad of year at the Pop Corn Music Awards.

By 1997, Samiou had released her fourth studio album "Chaos", which coincided with a gothic stylistic redirection. She wrote many of the songs herself. In 1998, Thierry Mugler named Samiou his muse. He invited her to his atelier in Paris where he made several costumes for her and she did an editorial for a Greek fashion magazine wearing Mugler's outfits. Later that year, a fire at the club where Samiou was supposed to begin singing a few days later destroyed all of her costumes and her show was postponed. At that time she stated in an interview that Hellenic Radio and Television had contacted her in order to participate in the Eurovision Song Contest 1997, but she ended up not going. In November 1998 she delivered her album "Apousies" (Absences).

In 1999, she decided to leave BMG Greece and signed a contract with Alpha Records which produced her sixth album "Didimi Psihi" (Twin soul), becoming her first gold-certified album by February 2000. It featured eleven tracks with music by Kostas Miliotakis and lyrics by Smaroula Maragoudaki.  By late 2000, Samiou entered the studio to record her seventh album "Axizo" (I'm worthy), which unlike her last album that was composed by Kostas Miliotakis with lyrics by Smaroula Maragoudaki, "Axizo" was composed by Samiou herself. It was released in January 2001 and soon became gold. Later on that year, she released her eighth album, the self-titled "Antzy". In December 2004 she released her ninth album "Aisthiseis".

After a four-year break in recording, Samiou released in 2008 the five-track CD single "Aspirini" (Aspirin) under the Heaven Music record label.

Discography

Singles and EPs

Music videos

References

External links
MAD TV Biography

20th-century Greek women singers
Greek laïko singers
Musicians from Piraeus
Living people
1960 births
21st-century Greek women singers